Litchfield Station is a pastoral lease that operates as a cattle station. The two adjoining sister properties are Elizabeth Downs and Tipperary Stations; all three currently operate as a single entity, often referred to as the Tipperary Group.

Description
Litchfield shares 12 holding paddocks, 6 permanent steel yards, 15 bores and a bitumen airstrip with neighbouring Tipperary.
There are numerous watering points in the form of creeks, springs and swamps scattered around the property; these can dry up before the onset of the wet season, making the cattle dependent on bores for a small part of the year.
A  floodplain that contains para grass and marine couch backed onto the Daly River mouth makes up part of Litchfield. The forested higher country is bound by the Reynolds River, which is the boundary of Litchfield National Park.

History
Litchfield was acquired by Melbourne-based barrister Alan Myers QC in 2003 for 50 million along with the 80,000 cattle. Myers also acquired Tipperary, Fish River and Elizabeth Downs Stations.

The Australian Agricultural Company offered 105 million to acquire Tipperary and Litchfield stations along with the 60,000 head of cattle in 2009, but the shareholder voted against the acquisition at an extraordinary general meeting held three months later.

In 2011, Australian Agricultural company purchased the Tipperary group's cattle herd of 53,000 head for 26 million, and also entered a one-year agreement to use the station group for agistment purposes with options to extend.

David Warriner, the head of the Northern Territory Cattlemen's Association, was still managing the group in 2012, when it was stocked with 70,000 cattle raised for live export to Indonesia.

See also
List of ranches and stations

References

Stations (Australian agriculture)
Pastoral leases in the Northern Territory
Litchfield National Park